Dacre may refer to:

Places
Dacre, Cumbria, England
Dacre Castle
Dacre, North Yorkshire, England
Dacre, New Zealand, in the Southland Region
Dacre, Ontario, Canada

People
Baron Dacre, an English hereditary title
Charlotte Dacre (1782–1841), English author
Henry Hugh Gordon Stoker (1885–1966), Irish navy officer and actor who took Dacre Stoker as his stage name
Hugh Trevor-Roper (1914–2003), historian who chose Baron Dacre as his title
Paul Dacre (born 1948), editor of British newspaper the Daily Mail
Dacre Stoker (born 1958), Canadian-American author, sportsman, and filmmaker
Dacre Montgomery (born 1994), Australian actor

Other uses
Dacre knot, a heraldic knot

See also
Dacres, a surname
Dacor (disambiguation)